Benjamin Franklin Harding (January 4, 1823June 16, 1899) was an American attorney and politician born in Pennsylvania. He held political offices in the Oregon Territory and later served as a United States senator from the state of Oregon.

Early life
He was born near Tunkhannock, Pennsylvania on January 4, 1823. Harding was educated in the public schools before he studying law. He passed the bar in 1847, and then set up practice in Joliet, Illinois in 1849. In 1850, he moved first to California, and then to the Oregon Territory.

Oregon politics
Harding was elected to the Oregon Territorial Legislature in 1850 to represent Marion County. Two years later he returned to that body and served as Speaker of the House of Representatives. Harding was then selected as United States district attorney in 1853. From 1854 to 1859 he served as the Secretary of the Oregon Territory, predecessor to the office of Oregon Secretary of State.

In 1858 Harding was elected to the Oregon State Legislature, but as Oregon had not yet been admitted to the Union, the assembly only met briefly before disbanding until 1859, when a special session was held and Harding served at the session. In 1860, he was elected again as a Democrat representing Marion County. At the next session of the legislature Harding was elected as Speaker of the Oregon House of Representatives, and this would be his final session in the state legislature.

Harding was elected to the United States Senate to fill Edward D. Baker's seat after the latter had died. He served from September 12, 1862, to March 3, 1865. While in the Senate, he and fellow Oregon Senator James Nesmith were the only Democrats in that chamber to vote for the Thirteenth Amendment to the United States Constitution to abolish slavery.

Later life and family
Harding was married twice, first in 1851 to Elizabeth Cox, with whom he had several children. After she died in 1868, he married F.W. Bush, a relative of Asahel Bush. After serving in the Senate, Harding retired to his farm near Salem.  A few years later he moved to Cottage Grove, Oregon where he died on June 16, 1899 and was buried at Cottage Grove Cemetery.

References

External links

1823 births
1899 deaths
Speakers of the Oregon House of Representatives
Democratic Party members of the Oregon House of Representatives
Union (American Civil War) political leaders
Members of the Oregon Territorial Legislature
19th-century American politicians
People from Tunkhannock, Pennsylvania
People from Cottage Grove, Oregon
United States Attorneys for the District of Oregon
Democratic Party United States senators from Oregon
Secretaries of State of Oregon